The First Secretary of the Moscow City Committee of the Communist Party of the Soviet Union, was the position of highest authority in the city of Moscow roughly equating to that of mayor. The position was created on November 10, 1917, following the October Revolution and abolished on August 24, 1991. The First Secretary was a de facto appointed position usually by the Politburo or the General Secretary himself. Until the abolition of the CPSU monopoly on power on March 14, 1990, he had actual power in Moscow.

First Secretaries

See also
Mayor of Moscow
Moscow Regional Committee of the Communist Party of the Soviet Union

Sources
 World Statesmen.org

City Committees of the Communist Party of the Soviet Union
Politics of Moscow
1917 establishments in Russia
1991 disestablishments in the Soviet Union